Vihasoo is a village in Kuusalu Parish, Harju County in northern Estonia, on the territory of Lahemaa National Park. It is situated around the mouth of the Loobu River to the Eru Bay (part of the Gulf of Finland).

References

Villages in Harju County